Talk Back is the debut album from American rapper Kembe X. It was released on July 15, 2016 on iTunes, Spotify, and Tidal.

Background
The album was produced by Bentley Hazelwood, Hippie Sabotage, The Antydote, Crooklin, DJ Fu, Aaron Bow, and Teddy Walton. Guest features include long time friend, Alex Wiley, as well as Zacari P and Roméo Testa.

Singles
On November 2, 2015, Kembe X released the first single from Talk Back titled "Buried Alive", with the title track coming out the following week. On January 6, 2016, the third single "Squad Day (Work Week)" was released. In June, two more songs, "10 Feet Tall" and "Welcome to America", were released to further promote the project.

Critical reception

Writing for Exclaim!, Leandre Nawej praised the album's "distinct sense of self-awareness and social commentary".

Track listing

References

Kembe X albums
2016 debut albums